Benedykt Zientara (15 June 1928 in Ołtarzew - 11 May 1983 in Warsaw) was a Polish historian.

He had been working at the Warsaw University since 1950. Zientara defended his PhD thesis under supervision of Marian Małowist. In 1961 he passed his habilitation. In 1971 he gained the title of professor.

Publications 
 Historia powszechna średniowiecza (1968, 1973, 1994, 1996, 1998, 2000, 2002, 2006, 2008, 2015)
 Henryk Brodaty i jego czasy (1975)
 Z dziejów rzemiosła w Polsce
 Dzieje gospodarcze Polski do roku 1939
 Świt narodów europejskich: powstawanie świadomości narodowej na obszarze Europy pokarolińskiej
 Dawna Rosja: despotyzm i demokracja
 Despotyzm i tradycje demokratyczne w dawnej historii Rosji
 Dzieje małopolskiego hutnictwa żelaznego XIV – XVII wiek

Footnotes

References
Antoni Mączak: Benedykt Zientara (15 VI 1928-11 V 1983), "Przegląd Historyczny", 75, 1984, No. 3, pp. 391–403.

20th-century Polish historians
Polish male non-fiction writers
1928 births
1983 deaths
People from Warsaw West County
Historians of Poland
Historians of Russia
University of Warsaw alumni
Academic staff of the University of Warsaw
Polish medievalists
Burials at Bródno Cemetery